Hortensia "Stretch" López García (also known as Hortencia López; January 20, 1930 – February 29, 2016) was a Mexican-American javelin thrower, softball player, and basketball player. Representing Mexico, she won a gold medal in the javelin at the inaugural 1951 Pan American Games. In 1978, she became the first female player to be elected to the El Paso Softball Hall of Fame, and later served as the organization's president.

García was one of only three women sent by Mexico to compete in the 1951 Pan American Games in Buenos Aires, compared with 64 Mexican men sent that year. In the javelin throw, she finished fifth in the preliminary round and advanced to the finals, where she threw 39.45 metres to take the gold medal, 1.37 m ahead of second-place Amelia Bert of the US. However, her performance was challenged by the Panama athletics delegation, who claimed that only four athletes should have been allowed to advance to the finals. It was the first protest in Pan American Games history.

García was initially disqualified, moving Panamanian athlete Judith Caballero up to the bronze medal position. But on the following day, it was announced that the protest was unsuccessful and overturned. Some records stil do not indicate García's win, or indicate her preliminary round mark of 32.68m as her final result. Nonetheless, García was admired by other female athletes. After the Games, it was revealed that a Chilean runner stole García's glasses to keep as a souvenir.

References

1930 births
Mexican female javelin throwers
Pan American Games medalists in athletics (track and field)
Pan American Games gold medalists for Mexico
Athletes (track and field) at the 1951 Pan American Games
American sportspeople of Mexican descent
Softball players from Texas
Sportspeople from El Paso, Texas
2016 deaths
Medalists at the 1951 Pan American Games
Basketball players from El Paso, Texas